Fret Fever (released under his last name of "Troiano") is the third solo release (and first for Capitol) by Italian/Canadian guitarist-singer/songwriter Domenic Troiano (having also done time in bands as diverse as James Gang & The Guess Who).  Self-produced and released in 1979, it featured his biggest hit in the disco-flavored "We All Need Love" (lead vocal-Roy Kenner).

Track listing
All songs written & arranged by Domenic Troiano, except where noted.

"South American Run" 3:41 (Troiano, Roy Kenner)
"Ambush" 3:45
"We All Need Love" 3:55
"It's You" 3:14
"It's Raining, It's Raining" 3:26
"Give Me a Chance" 2:13
"Your Past" 3:44
"Fret Fever" 3:48
"Brains on the Floor" 4:01
"Victim of Circumstance" 3:38
"Achilles" 3:56
"The End" 0:45

Personnel
Domenic Troiano - vocals, rhythm, lead, acoustic guitars
David Tyson - keyboards, additional percussion, backing vocals
Bob Wilson - bass, backing vocals
Paul DeLong - drums, percussion
Bob Boyer, Dalbello, Eddie Schwartz, Fred Boyer, Colina Phillips, Shawne Jackson - backing vocals
Roy Kenner - Lead and background vocals

Production
Produced by Domenic Troiano
Reissue Producer: Warren Stewart
Recorded & Mixed by Mike Jones, with recording assistance by Hugh Cooper
Mastered by George Marino

References

External links
"Track information at Discogs
Album credits at Allmusic

1979 albums
Capitol Records albums